Boardman House may refer to:
(sorted by state, then city/town)

 Boardman House (East Haddam, Connecticut)
 John Boardman House, Boxford, Massachusetts, listed on the National Register of Historic Places (NRHP) in Essex County
 Boardman House (Saugus, Massachusetts), listed on the NRHP in Essex County
 Vinton-Boardman Farmhouse, Southbridge, Massachusetts, listed on the NRHP in Worcester County
 E. Boardman House, Wakefield, Massachusetts, listed on the NRHP in Middlesex County
 Boardman House (Ithaca, New York), listed on the NRHP in Tompkins County
 Boardman–Mitchell House, Staten Island, New York, listed on the NRHP in Richmond County
 Boardman-Webb-Bugg House, Austin, Texas, listed on the NRHP in Travis County